Aileen Mary Whelan (born 11 August 1991) is an English footballer who plays as a midfielder or forward for FA WSL club Leicester City. Whelan started her playing career in 1996 at Rugby Town Girls FC, after it was set up by Steve Heighton and Michelle Guppy and her father Declan  became a coach.

Club career
Whelan started her senior career turning out for Rushden & Diamonds F.C., Barnet Ladies F.C. and Milton Keynes Dons.  She then signed for Nottingham Forest, ahead of their 2011–12 Women's Premier League season and scored on her debut for the club. She stayed with Forest for the 2012–13 season.

Whelan transferred to Notts County during the summer of 2013 ahead of their maiden season in the FA WSL.

She left the club following its folding and joined Everton in May 2017. Everton went on to win the FA WSL 2 Spring Series.

Whelan signed for FA WSL 2 side Brighton & Hove Albion in September 2017. During her first season at the club she was named February 2018 WSL 2 Player of the Month. The club joined FA WSL 1, the top tier of women's football in England, ahead of the 2018–19 season.

International career
Whelan represented England at their under-23 level. She also competed for Team GB at the World Student Games in 2013, winning the gold medal.

Personal life 
Whelan holds a master's degree in child psychology and works part-time as a play therapist outside of football. She has a young child with her partner, former Brighton defender Fern Whelan.

References

External links
 Profile at the Brighton & Hove Albion F.C. website
 

1991 births
Living people
Brighton & Hove Albion W.F.C. players
Women's Super League players
Women's association football midfielders
English women's footballers
Barnet F.C. Ladies players
Nottingham Forest Women F.C. players
Everton F.C. (women) players
Notts County L.F.C. players
Sportspeople from Stafford
FA Women's National League players
Universiade gold medalists for Great Britain
Universiade medalists in football
LGBT association football players
Medalists at the 2013 Summer Universiade
Child psychologists
21st-century English LGBT people